Standard Chartered Pakistan is a Pakistani banking and financial services company in Pakistan and is a wholly-owned subsidiary of British multinational bank Standard Chartered.

It is Pakistan's oldest and largest foreign commercial bank.  It employs over 2,200 people in its 40 branches in 10 cities of Pakistan.

History
The history of Standard Chartered in Pakistan dates back to 1863, when the Chartered Bank of India, Australia and China first established its operations in Karachi.

In 2006, Standard Chartered Bank acquired Pakistan's Union Bank. On 30 December 2006, Standard Chartered merged Union Bank with its own subsidiary, Standard Chartered Bank (Pakistan), to create Pakistan's sixth largest bank.

FinCEN 
Standard Chartered was named in FinCEN leak, published by Buzzfeed News and the International Consortium of Investigative Journalists (ICIJ). It had four suspicious transactions flagged.

See also

 Banking in Pakistan
 Union Bank (Pakistan)

References

External links 
 Standard Chartered Pakistan

Banks of Pakistan
Companies listed on the Pakistan Stock Exchange
Standard Chartered
Pakistani subsidiaries of foreign companies